The 2008 Coastal Carolina Chanticleers football team represented Coastal Carolina University in the 2008 NCAA Division I FCS football season. The Chanticleers were led by sixth-year head coach David Bennett and played their home games at Brooks Stadium. Coastal Carolina competed as a member of the Big South Conference. They finished the season 6–6 with a 1–4 record in conference play.

Schedule

References

Coastal Carolina
Coastal Carolina Chanticleers football seasons
Coastal Carolina Chanticleers football